Timothy Calder Rutten (April 8,1950 – September 8, 2022) was an American journalist with the Los Angeles Daily News. He worked for the Los Angeles Times for nearly 40 years between 1971 and 2011.

Education
A native of San Bernardino, California, Rutten majored in political science at California State University, Los Angeles.

Career
Rutten started at the paper in 1971 as a copy editor in the View section. His positions in subsequent years included city bureau chief, metro reporter, editorial writer, assistant national editor, Opinion editor and assistant editor for the Editorial Page.  He was laid off from his position as an Op Ed contributor in a staff cutback in 2011.

Awards
Rutten won a 1991 award from the Greater Los Angeles Press Club for editorial writing. He wrote about the 1994 Northridge earthquake, which won him a share of a 1995 Pulitzer Prize awarded to the staff of the Times for Breaking News Reporting. He became the first to notice, and publicly expose, several doctored or manipulated photographs in the 2006 Lebanon War photographs controversies. In 2007, he was honored by the Anti-Defamation League for advancing the ideals of the First Amendment.

Death
Rutten was married to Leslie Abramson. He died in September 2022 after falling at his home in Alhambra, California at the age of 72.

References

Year of birth missing
20th-century births
2022 deaths
American male journalists
California State University, Los Angeles alumni
People from San Bernardino, California
Place of birth missing